In Mormonism, revelation is communication from God to man. Latter Day Saints teach that the Latter Day Saint movement began with a revelation from God, which began a process of restoring the gospel of Jesus Christ to the earth. Latter Day Saints also teach that revelation is the foundation of the church established by Jesus Christ and that it remains an essential element of his true church today. Continuous revelation provides individual Latter Day Saints with a "testimony", described by Richard Bushman as "one of the most potent words in the Mormon lexicon".

In response to an inquiry on the beliefs of the church, Joseph Smith wrote what came to be called the Wentworth Letter, the last section of which was canonized as the Articles of Faith. The fifth, sixth, seventh and ninth articles state the essence of Latter Day Saint belief concerning revelation:

 5 We believe that a man must be called of God, by prophecy, and by the laying on of hands by those who are in authority, to preach the Gospel and administer in the ordinances thereof.
 6 We believe in the same organization that existed in the Primitive Church, namely, apostles, prophets, pastors, teachers, evangelists, and so forth.
 7 We believe in the gift of tongues, prophecy, revelation, visions, healing, interpretation of tongues, and so forth.
 9 We believe all that God has revealed, all that He does now reveal, and we believe that He will yet reveal many great and important things pertaining to the Kingdom of God.

Most Latter Day Saint denominations believe that the Lord "will yet reveal many great and important things" to his church through modern apostles and prophets; some go as far as to claim that all leaders of their churches are "called of God, by prophecy"; and that each member of the church can receive personal revelation to strengthen their faith and guide them in their own lives.

Doctrine

The Latter Day Saint concept of revelation includes the belief that revelation from God is available to all those who earnestly seek it with the intent of doing good.

The Church of Jesus Christ of Latter-day Saints (LDS Church) and some other Latter Day Saint denominations claim to be led by revelation from God to a living prophet, who receives God's word just as Abraham, Moses, Peter, and other ancient prophets and apostles did. It also teaches that everyone is entitled to personal revelation with respect to his or her stewardship. Thus, parents can receive revelation in raising their families, individuals can receive revelation to help them meet personal challenges, church officers may receive revelation for those whom they serve, and apostles and prophets may receive revelation for the entire church. The important consequence of this is that each person may receive confirmation that particular doctrines taught by a prophet are true, as well as gain divine insight in using those truths for their own benefit and eternal progress. In the LDS Church, personal revelation is expected and encouraged, and many converts believe that personal revelation from God was instrumental in their conversion.

Joseph F. Smith, the sixth president and prophet of the LDS Church, summarized the church's belief concerning revelation by saying, "We believe ... in the principle of direct revelation from God to man."

Smith also more specifically detailed the importance of the principle of modern-day revelation to the church he then led:

James E. Talmage, a member of the Quorum of the Twelve Apostles, attempted to connect this belief with the nature of God and also emphasized the importance of the principle of continuing revelation to his faith:

Community of Christ has added a number of revelations to their canon from the president of their church. Other Latter Day Saint denominations have also added new scriptures. There is no one accepted way among Latter Day Saints as to where or how revelations should be received. 

Latter Day Saints believe that God answers prayers. Communicating with God is seen by many Latter Day Saints as an important part of developing faith and coming to know God, resulting ultimately in exaltation if the person remains faithful to covenants with Jesus Christ.

Apostolic revelation
Latter Day Saints believe that the need for guidance by apostolic revelation in Jesus Christ's church is as great today as it was when Peter, Paul, and other apostles wrote the letters that eventually became the New Testament.

James E. Faust, a member of the Quorum of the Twelve Apostles, spoke on the need for continual divine guidance of Jesus Christ's church in both doctrinal and administrative matters:

LDS Church president Gordon B. Hinckley further explained:

Inspired vs. infallible 
The LDS Church believes apostolic revelation to be inspired, but not infallible. One leader wrote, "We consider God, and him alone, infallible; therefore his revealed word to us cannot be doubted, though we may be in doubt some times about the knowledge which we obtain from human sources, and occasionally be obliged to admit that something which we had considered to be a fact, was really only a theory." Leaders are still considered regular people with "their opinions and prejudices and are left to work out their own problems without inspiration in many instances." Brigham Young taught "the greatest fear I have is that the people of this Church will accept what we say as the will of the Lord without first praying about it and getting the witness within their own hearts that what we say is the word of the Lord." Members are taught to rely on the Holy Ghost to judge, and if a revelation is in harmony with the revealed word of God, it should be accepted.

Dallin H. Oaks explains: "Revelations from God ... are not constant. We believe in continuing revelation, not continuous revelation. We are often left to work out problems without the dictation or specific direction of the Spirit." Thus, the current prophet can clarify, correct or change any previous teachings.

However, once a doctrine has been accepted by the church by "common consent", it becomes part of the standard works, and then takes precedence over any other revelation.  Members of the LDS church only consider themselves bound by doctrine found in the standard works. Also, though it is not considered scripture, Latter-day Saints also believe the United States Constitution to be a divinely inspired document.

Called of God, by prophecy
Latter Day Saints believe that all who serve in any position in the church, from apostles who lead the entire church to deacons who pass the sacrament, must be "called of God, by prophecy, and by the laying on of hands by those who are in authority".  This requirement applies to both hierarchical priesthood leadership callings (such as bishop), as well as other priesthood and non-priesthood callings (such as Sunday school instructor, organist, etc.).

Henry B. Eyring, a member of the Quorum of the Twelve Apostles, gave the following counsel to those called to serve.  This counsel illustrates many key LDS beliefs concerning those "called of God, by prophecy",

Personal revelation

While teaching the importance of studying the words of both ancient and modern prophets, Latter Day Saints also emphasize the necessity of personal revelation from God by the power of the Holy Ghost as the only pathway to true knowledge of Jesus Christ:

Boyd K. Packer, a member of the Quorum of the Twelve Apostles, explained the source and process of personal revelation:

In another sermon, Packer warned Latter Day Saints against the dangers of over reliance on a rational or theological approach to knowledge of gospel principles:

LDS Church President Spencer W. Kimball also emphasized the importance of personal revelation versus the analytical approach in understanding the message of Jesus Christ:

Although Latter Day Saints believe that personal revelation is an essential part of the plan of salvation, leaders of the church emphasize that true personal revelation should never contradict official revelation from the leadership of the church. Hartman Rector Jr. taught some basic criteria during a speech at BYU entitled "How to Know if Revelation Is from the Lord" that can help members of the church know whether the revelation that someone receives is actually coming from God. The following excerpt is the conclusion of this speech.

James E. Faust explained the difference between apostolic and personal revelation: "The prophets, seers, and revelators have had and still have the responsibility and privilege of receiving and declaring the word of God for the world. Individual members, parents, and leaders have the right to receive revelation for their own responsibility but have no duty nor right to declare the word of God beyond the limits of their own responsibility."

Spirit of prophecy
The concept of the "spirit of prophecy" as found in the LDS Church was first described by Joseph Smith, who believed that each individual person was capable of receiving revelation for themselves and those they presided over in their group or family. This enables Latter Day Saints to understand to what extent they are in harmony with the mind and the will of God. The term "personal revelation" is also common parlance.

Two Biblical scriptures that are often used to remind LDS adherents of the importance of seeking personal revelation are Revelation 19:10, which concludes: "worship God: for the testimony of Jesus is the spirit of prophecy" and Numbers 11:29, which concludes: "would God that all the Lord's people were prophets, and that the Lord would put his spirit upon them!" Thus, the spirit of prophecy is understood to be an important gift of the Spirit that is available through adherence to true worship of God, obedience to the laws and ordinances of the gospel, study of the scriptures, following leaders who have been called by revelation, and understanding the guidance offered by the gift of the Holy Ghost. (See Doctrine and Covenants Sections 8 and 9).

Practice
Each Latter-day Saint is expected to use personal revelation to determine how best to apply gospel principles and the commandments in his or her life in a path toward perfection. It is accepted that not all members will agree on how to interpret the same scripture; rather, each person is responsible to determine how it should be interpreted for himself or herself.

For example, the dietary code called the Word of Wisdom contains the statement "And again, hot drinks are not for the body or belly." Church leaders later clarified the words "hot drinks" to mean coffee and tea. The Word of Wisdom is interpreted in various ways within the church. Although abstinence from coffee, tea, alcohol and tobacco are considered 'absolutes' by most Latter-day Saints, many will drink decaffeinated coffee or herbal tea. Some Latter-day Saints choose to avoid Coca-Cola, Pepsi, and other drinks containing caffeine, but other Latter-day Saints see nothing wrong with drinking such beverages. In the 2010s,official statements from the Church clarified that drinking caffeine was not a violation of the Word of Wisdom. Adherents to the Latter Day Saint movement likewise interpret the other parts of the Word of Wisdom relating to the kinds of foods to be eaten and avoided in various ways. It is considered inappropriate for one person to challenge another person's interpretation, although priesthood leaders such as bishops may determine when an interpretation is outside acceptable bounds. Rationalization of interpretations is tempered by the belief that each person must answer for their choices at the final judgment.

Individuals are encouraged to rely on personal revelation and to never take leader's statements at face value without investigating for themselves if they be true. Brigham Young said,

J. Reuben Clark wrote that there is only one way that church members can be sure that leaders are speaking for the Lord,

Future scripture
Many Latter-day Saints believe that new scripture will be revealed or discovered and translated involving prophets among the Ten Lost Tribes at some time before or during the Millennium (Book of Mormon).

See also

 1978 Revelation on Priesthood
 Direct revelation

References

Further reading 

 

Latter Day Saint terms